Hepburn Island is an island located in the south of the Coronation Gulf, just across Grays Bay from the mainland.  It is in the Kitikmeot Region, Nunavut, Canada.

Islands of Coronation Gulf
Uninhabited islands of Kitikmeot Region